Bathroom privileges refers to the rules or the possibility of the use of a toilet. Most commonly, the term is used in the following settings:

 In schools, it refers to permission for students to leave the classroom during lessons. Often this is associated with certain regulations, such as usage of the hall pass.
 As a doctor's prescription, it refers to permission for a patient to use the facilities. This may be due to a medical condition requiring bed rest (e.g. high-risk pregnancy), or the avoidance of certain defecation postures (e.g. sitting or squatting)  Still another example is "BRP for bowel movement only". On the other hand, if a patient has a communicable disease, the physician may wish to restrict the chances of it spreading by disallowing them from using the shared toilet on the ward.
 At some workplaces, it refers to formal rules, e.g. the number and the duration of the usage of the bathroom.

References

Public toilets
Education rights
Medical treatments
Rules
Education policy
Education and health